Karcsa is a village in Borsod-Abaúj-Zemplén county, Hungary, that dates back to the time of the Hungarian settlement (late 9th century). There is a 1000-year-old graveyard in the neighboring town Karos and archaeological discoveries confirm this. The village is well known for its Romanesque church built probably around 1000 after the Huns converted to Christianity.

Karcsa was situated in what was north-central Hungary from the founding of the country until 1920 when the Treaty of Trianon split Hungary, depriving it of 70% of its territory and leaving 60% of its people in surrounding countries. Now it is a border town on the northern Hungarian border with Slovakia.

Karcsa has a small lake which is quite popular with fishermen and campers in summer and for skating in winter. Although it doesn't have any claim to fame other than its church, Karcsa is near several popular sightseeing areas, including Nagy Rozvagy which has an annual summer "ancient village" festival, showing how the Huns lived; Karos, the 1000-year-old Hun cemetery; and the Tokaj wine region.

References
 Gerevich T. (1938): Magyarország románkori emlékei. (Die romanische Denkmäler Ungarns.) Egyetemi nyomda. Budapest
 Gerő, L. (1984): Magyar műemléki ABC. (Hungarian Architectural Heritage ABC.) Budapest
 Gervers-Molnár, V. (1972): A középkori Magyarország rotundái. (Rotunda in the Medieval Hungary). Akadémiai, Budapest
 Henszlmann, I. (1876): Magyarország ó-keresztyén, román és átmeneti stylü mű-emlékeinek rövid ismertetése, (Old-Christian, Romanesque and Transitional Style Architecture in Hungary). Királyi Magyar Egyetemi Nyomda, Budapest
 Genthon I. (1959): Magyarország műemlékei. (Architectural Heritage of Hungary). Budapest
 Szilágyi A. (2008): A Kárpát-medence Árpád-kori rotundái és centrális templomai. (The Rotunda and Central Building Churches in the Carpathian Basin.) Semmelweis Kiadó, Budapest
 Szőnyi O. (É.n.): Régi magyar templomok. Alte Ungarische Kirchen. Anciennes églises Hongroises. Hungarian Churches of Yore. A Műemlékek Országos Bizottsága. Mirályi Magyar Egyetemi Nyomda, Budapest.
 Jósvainé Dankó K. (é.n.): Karcsa. Református templom. (Karcsa. Reformed Churches.) Tájak, korok múzeumok kiskönyvtára, 572. TKM Egyesület, Budapest

External links 
 Street map
 Article about the village
 Karcsa village inviting article 

Populated places in Borsod-Abaúj-Zemplén County
Romanesque architecture in Hungary